The 2014 Carlton Football Club season was the Carlton Football Club's 151st season of competition, and 118th as a member of the Australian Football League, and served as a celebration of the sesquicentenary of the club's foundation in 1864. The club finished thirteenth out of eighteen clubs in the 2014 AFL season.

Club summary
The 2014 AFL season was the 118th season of the VFL/AFL competition since its inception in 1897; and, having competed in every season, it was also the 118th season contested by the Carlton Football Club. As in previous years, the club's primary home ground was Etihad Stadium, with home games expecting to draw larger crowds played at the Melbourne Cricket Ground, and with traditional home ground Visy Park serving as the training and administrative base. The club's two joint major sponsors, car manufacturer Hyundai and confectionery company Mars, were unchanged; and, the club extended its deal with Hyundai until 2017. As has been since 1998, Nike will produce and manufacture the club's on-and-off field apparel. Carlton continued its alignment with the Northern Blues in the Victorian Football League, allowing Carlton-listed players to play with the Northern Blues when not selected in AFL matches. The club's membership for the 2014 season was 47,485, a 6.1% reduction from the record membership of 50,561 enjoyed in 2013, making Carlton one of only four clubs to suffer a drop in membership in the 2014 season; the club also posted as $1,600,000 operating loss. Both of these were in part blamed on the club's experimental fixture, which including four games in the non-traditional Sunday night timeslot, and the negative effect of the club's 0–4 start to the season.

Senior Personnel
Former club champion Stephen Kernahan, who had been club president since August 2008, continued in the role into the start of the 2014 season; but he announced in October 2013 that it would be his last season as president. In April 2014, club vice-president and businessman Mark LoGiudice was announced as Kernahan's successor, and he formally took over the role from 23 June. Club CEO Greg Swann, who had been in the role since March 2007, stepped down at the same time as Kernahan; he was replaced in August by Steven Trigg, who left the Adelaide Crows after having served as CEO there for the previous twelve years.

Marc Murphy continued as club captain for his second season in the role, and Andrew Carrazzo and Kade Simpson continued as vice-captains. The other members of the eight-man leadership group, all of whom were not in the group in 2013, were: Michael Jamison (who became deputy vice-captain), Lachlan Henderson, Andrew Walker, Bryce Gibbs and Brock McLean.

Squad for 2014
Statistics are correct as of end of 2013 season.
Flags represent the state of origin, i.e. the state in which the player played his Under-18s football.

For players: (c) denotes captain, (vc) denotes vice-captain, (dvc) denotes deputy vice-captain, (lg) denotes leadership group.
For coaches: (s) denotes senior coach, (cs) denotes caretaker senior coach, (a) denotes assistant coach, (d) denotes development coach.

Playing list changes

The following summarises all player changes between the conclusion of the 2013 season and the conclusion of the 2014 season.

In

Out

List management

Season summary

Pre-season matches
The first two practice matches were played as part of the 2014 NAB Challenge, and were played under modified pre-season rules, including nine-point goals. The final practice match was not part of the NAB Challenge, and was played under premiership season rules.

Home and away season

Ladder

Team awards and records
Game records
Round 6 – Carlton recorded a late come-from-behind win against West Coast. West Coast led by 24 points after 14 minutes of the final quarter, before Carlton scored five goals in ten minutes to take a six-point lead. West Coast missed three shots at goal in the final few minutes, hitting the post twice, and Carlton won by three points.
Round 22 – Carlton's score of 5.7 (37) against  was its lowest in any match since Round 8, 2006.
Round 22 – Carlton's losing margin of 103 points against  was its highest in any match since Round 16, 2007.
Round 23 – Carlton and  both gave up five-goal leads in their drawn match in the final round. Carlton kicked six goals to one in the first quarter to lead by 30 points; Essendon then kicked ten of the next eleven goals to take a 30-point lead early in the third quarter; Carlton recovered to take the lead midway through the final quarter, before a tight finish which ended in a draw.

Season records
 Carlton opened the season with four straight losses for the first time since 1989.

Notable events
Special guernsey designs
The club wore three specially-designed guernseys during the season:
 In Rounds 7, 13 and 23, against ,  and  respectively, the club wore its "Heritage Guernsey" as part of sesquicentennial celebrations. This guernsey featured the 1970s-era block-style monogram on the front, and listed the club's premierships years on the back.
 In Round 10 against , the club wore the "Member Guernsey" as part of sesquicentennial celebrations. This guernsey featured the 1910s-era script monogram, and featured in small white print the names of members who pledged to appear on it.
 In Round 11, all clubs in the league wore an Indigenous Guernsey, as part of the AFL's Indigenous Round. Carlton's Guernsey, worn against , was the same as the home guernsey, except it displayed a boomerang underneath the monogram which was white but decorated in the style of aboriginal art; the F in the monogram was likewise decorated.

Sesquicentennial celebrations
In 2014, the club celebrated the 150th anniversary of its foundation in 1864. The club arranged several events in recognition of the milestone:
 Heritage and member-recognition guernseys were worn at a total of four matches during the season.
 On Sunday 3 May, a team of retired Carlton players (mostly from the 1990s era) played against a team of retired Collingwood players from the same era at Visy Park in the "Clash of the Old Foes". Collingwood 9.15 (69) defeated Carlton 7.7 (49) before a crowd of around 1,000, and the gate was donated to the Peter MacCallum Cancer Centre and the E. J. Whitten Foundation for Prostate Cancer Awareness.
The club held a fan poll to vote on the 25 greatest moments in Carlton Football Club history, with the results revealed at the Round 10 match against Adelaide. The top five moments were:
 The 1970 Grand Final, in which Carlton overcame a 44-point half-time deficit to beat .
 The specky taken by Alex Jesaulenko over 's Graeme Jenkin in the second quarter of the 1970 Grand Final.
 The assist by Wayne Harmes on the game-winning goal by Ken Sheldon in the 1979 Grand Final win against .
 The tackle laid by Fraser Brown on 's Dean Wallis in the final minute of Carlton's one-point victory in the 1999 Preliminary Final.
 The 1995 premiership, in which the club won a then-record twenty home-and-away matches.
The club named the best twelve players in its history, announcing the results on 14 June. The top twelve were, in order: John Nicholls, Stephen Kernahan, Bruce Doull, Alex Jesaulenko, Stephen Silvagni, Craig Bradley, Robert Walls, Wayne Johnston, Geoff Southby, Greg Williams, Ken Hands and Chris Judd.

Dismissal of Josh Bootsma
On 3 June, third-year defender Josh Bootsma was sacked from the club, with a year and a half remaining on his contract. The club's action was in response to an incident in which Bootsma sent explicit photographs over social media application Snapchat, which breached both Carlton's and the AFL's codes of conduct. The club also revealed that Bootsma had a history of problems with behaviour and dedication, having had a history of tardiness at training. Bootsma had played fourteen games for the club, but none in 2014.

Suspensions of Mitch Robinson and Jeff Garlett
Mitch Robinson and Jeff Garlett were involved in a brawl outside a night venue on Lonsdale Street at 5am on the morning of Sunday 3 August, which left Robinson with a fractured eye-socket. The players lied to the club about the incident, with Robinson claiming to have fractured his eye-socket in a boxing session at training. As a consequence, the club fined Garlett $2,500 and refused to select him in the senior team for the following week – he had been dropped to the Northern Blues several weeks earlier, and was confirmed by the coaching staff as having shown enough form in the VFL to be brought back to the seniors immediately before the incident – and Robinson was fined $5,000, and did not play again for the season due to his injury.

Robinson was cleared of wrongdoing by police, and Garlett pleated guilty to behaving in a riotous manner. The men on the other side of the attack pleaded guilty to affray and recklessly causing injury to Robinson, and were sentenced to 300 hours' community service.

Individual awards and records

John Nicholls Medal
The Carlton Football Club Best and Fairest awards night took place on 17 September. The John Nicholls Medal, for the best and fairest player of the club, as well as several other awards, were presented on the night.

John Nicholls Medal
The winner of the John Nicholls Medal was Bryce Gibbs, who polled 105 votes. It was Gibbs' first John Nicholls Medal. Simpson won ahead of Marc Murphy and Kade Simpson. The top ten is given below.

Other awards
The following other awards were presented on John Nicholls Medal night:-
Best First-Year Player – Ciarán Sheehan
Best Clubman – Dylan Buckley
Most Improved Player – Sam Rowe
Spirit of Carlton Award – Dylan Buckley
DI Count Award (for the player who led the club statistically in defensive indicators) – Sam Rowe
Women of Carlton Player Ambassador – Simon White
The Carltonians High Achiever Award – Kade Simpson
Inner Blue Ruthness Award – Marc Murphy
Hyundai MVP Award (the most valuable player as voted by fans in an online poll) – Bryce Gibbs

Leading Goalkickers 
Jarrad Waite was Carlton's leading goalkicker for the season, with 29 goals. It was the first time Waite had won Carlton's goalkicking, in the last of his twelve seasons with the club.

AFLPA Awards 
For each of the AFLPA awards, one or three Carlton players were nominated following internal vote of Carlton players; Marc Murphy was also nominated for the Best Captain award by default. No Carlton player placed in the top five for his award.

Leigh Matthews Trophy (Most Valuable Player)
Bryce Gibbs (nominated)
Marc Murphy (nominated)
Chris Yarran (nominated)
Robert Rose Award (Most Courageous Player)
Kade Simpson (nominated)
Best First Year Player
Blaine Johnson (nominated)

Other awards
All-Australian Team
Bryce Gibbs was Carlton's only nominee in the 40-man squad for the 2014 All-Australian team. He was not selected in the final team of 22.

NAB AFL Rising Star
The following Carlton players were nominated for the 2014 NAB AFL Rising Star award:
Round 2 – Dylan Buckley (nominated)
Round 16 – Troy Menzel (nominated)
Buckley was Carlton's first Rising Star nominee for more than three years; Carlton's previous nominee, Jeff Garlett (nominated Round 19, 2010) was in fact playing his 100th career game in the same match in which Buckley was nominated. Neither Buckley nor Menzel polled a vote for the final award.

Mark of the Year
Levi Casboult was one of the three nominees for the 2014 AFL Mark of the Year for the high mark he took from the back of a pack of five other players against  in Round 13.

Australian Football Hall of Fame
Two former Carlton players were among the six people inducted into the Australian Football Hall of Fame in 2014:
Ern Henfry, who played 84 games for Carlton from 1947 to 1952, twice won the Robert Reynolds Trophy and captained the club to the 1947 premiership
Anthony Koutoufides, who played 278 games for Carlton from 1992 to 2007, twice won the Robert Reynolds Trophy and was part of the 1995 premiership team

Northern Blues 
The Carlton Football Club had a full affiliation with the Northern Blues during the 2014 season. It was the twelfth season of the clubs' affiliation, which had been in place since 2003. Carlton senior- and rookie-listed players who were not selected to play in the Carlton team were eligible to play for either the Northern Bullants seniors or reserves team in the Victorian Football League. As in 2013, home games were shared between the VFL club's traditional home ground, Preston City Oval, and Carlton's traditional home ground, Visy Park. The Northern Blues finished 11th out of 16 in the VFL with a record of 7–11, missing the final eight by ten premiership points and percentage.

References

Carlton Football Club seasons
Carlton